Incarnate Word High School is a private, Roman Catholic, all-girls high school in Midtown San Antonio, Texas, United States established in 1881. It is located in the Roman Catholic Archdiocese of San Antonio and is a division of the University of the Incarnate Word.

History

In 1866, facing a cholera outbreak in Galveston immediately after the Civil War and unable to summon help from American congregations, Bishop Claude Dubuis called religious sisters from France to nurse the sick. Three sisters who answered the call along with Dubuis founded the Sisters of Charity of the Incarnate Word. In 1869 Dubius nominated three sisters to start a San Antonio congregation, which subsequently established an infirmary (later to become Christus Santa Rosa Hospital), an orphanage, and a school.

In July 1881 the Sisters of Charity of the Incarnate Word, with a charter from the State of Texas, first opened a schoolhouse for girls on Avenue D which later moved and in 1893 grew into St. Patrick's Academy, considered the forerunner to IWHS and also located on Government Hill. To house the flourishing congregation, in 1897 the sisters purchased  acres of land from George Brackenridge.

The sisters opened an all-girls boarding school that awarded high school diplomas in 1903, and, at what became College and Academy of the Incarnate Word, in 1910 awarded its first bachelor's degree. They opened the five-story administration building in the mid-1920s that served students first grade through college. Texas Association of Colleges recognized Incarnate Word as a senior college in 1920, and the school began graduate studies by 1950.

As the school expanded over time, in 1950 enrollment necessitated a distinct high school building, to be constructed at the high school's current location of 727 E Hildebrand Ave, situated on the scenic hill known as Mount Erin. 1961 saw Mount Erin Chapel built, repurposing the original chapel as the testing and academic center.

In 1970, the high school incorporated modular scheduling and built its science building. In 1978, despite resistance from Sisters of Charity of the Incarnate Word and the San Antonio Conservation Society, the Texas Highway Department constructed US 281 through Incarnate Word school, separating the high school from the college, with the Sky Bridge connecting the campuses as the sisters stipulated. IWHS became part of the Brainpower Connection with Incarnate Word College (now the University of the Incarnate Word) in 1989.

References

Citations

Notes

Sources

External links

 

Catholic secondary schools in Texas
Educational institutions established in 1881
Girls' schools in Texas
High schools in San Antonio
1881 establishments in Texas